The men's 110 metres hurdles event at the 1986 World Junior Championships in Athletics was held in Athens, Greece, at Olympic Stadium on 18 and 19 July.  106.7 cm (3'6) (senior implement) hurdles were used.

Medalists

Results

Final
19 July
Wind: -0.8 m/s

Semifinals
19 July

Semifinal 1

Wind: -0.7 m/s

Semifinal 2

Wind: +0.4 m/s

Heats
18 July

Heat 1

Wind: -0.4 m/s

Heat 2

Wind: +1.1 m/s

Heat 3

Wind: -0.5 m/s

Heat 4

Wind: -0.9 m/s

Participation
According to an unofficial count, 26 athletes from 18 countries participated in the event.

References

110 metres hurdles
Sprint hurdles at the World Athletics U20 Championships